Mathur Shiva Temple is a Hindu temple located in Kunnamkulam of Thrissur District of India. It is believed that the Siva linga is Rudrakshasila which is irregular in shape, red in colour and is untouched by the human sculptor. The presiding deity of the temple is Shiva located in main Sanctum Sanctorum, facing West and Lord Parvathi located in same Sanctum Sanatorium, facing East. According to folklore, sage Parashurama has installed the idol. The temple is a part of the 108 famous Shiva temples in Kerala.

See also
 108 Shiva Temples
 Temples of Kerala
 Hindu temples in Thrissur Rural

Temple Photos

References

108 Shiva Temples
Hindu temples in Thrissur district
Shiva temples in Kerala